Invisible City is a 2009 documentary film by Hubert Davis about young Black Canadian men at risk in Toronto's Regent Park district. Davis spent three years filming two boys in their final years of high school.

The primary subjects of the film are Kendell and Mikey, students at Nelson Mandela Park Public School. Invisible City follows their struggles with academic and behavioral issues, and their sense of futility.

Invisible City is produced by Industry  Pictures/Shine Films in co-production with the National Film Board of Canada.

Reception
Invisible  City received the Best Canadian Feature Documentary award at the 2009 Hot Docs Canadian International Documentary Festival. In announcing its decision, the Hot Docs festival jury stated:

The film opened theatrically at the Royal Theatre in Toronto in  February  2010, before premiering on TVOntario.

References

External links
 
 

National Film Board of Canada documentaries
Documentary films about Toronto
Films directed by Hubert Davis
2009 films
Canadian documentary films
2009 documentary films
Documentary films about high school
Regent Park
Education in Toronto
Documentary films about Black Canadians
2000s English-language films
2000s Canadian films